Cotoneaster atropurpureus, the purple-flowered cotoneaster, is a species of flowering plant in the genus Cotoneaster of the family Rosaceae, native to the Hubei province of China. It can be used as groundcover or trained to ascend up a wall or other support. Its fan-shaped, arching branches bear small, rounded, glossy green leaves turning purple in autumn. Red/black flowers are followed by small, globose, scarlet fruits (pomes).

The cultivar 'Variegatus' (syn. C. horizontalis 'Variegatus'), with leaves margined in cream, turning red in autumn, is often seen in cultivation. It has gained the Royal Horticultural Society's Award of Garden Merit.

References

atropurpureus